The Lovel D. Millikan House is a historic home located in Indianapolis, Indiana. It was built in 1911 by architect Frank Baldwin Hunter and typifies the American Foursquare style. It has a square shape with two stories, a hipped roof with central dormer window, and rectangular front porch that spans the width of the building. The house also features specific Craftsman styles that separate it from similar homes in the neighborhood. These features include the stylized motifs in the exterior stucco and brick, pyramidal roofs over the front porch entry and roof dormer, and interior features throughout the home.

It was listed on the National Register of Historic Places in 2017.

References

External links

Houses on the National Register of Historic Places in Indiana
American Foursquare architecture
American Craftsman architecture in Indiana
Residential buildings completed in 1911
Buildings and structures in Indianapolis
National Register of Historic Places in Indianapolis